A South Park Republican is a person (especially a Republican) who holds center-right political beliefs influenced by the popular American animated television series South Park. Many may hold generally conservative views on fiscal issues, but more moderate or liberal in regard to social issues such as LGBT rights and abortion. The term is arguably a contemporary variation on the older classical liberal, with an overlay of pop culture aesthetic. The term coined by Andrew Sullivan in 2001.

Political views of Trey Parker and Matt Stone 
Trey Parker and Matt Stone, the two creators of South Park, have vocally expressed hatred of both the Republican and Democratic parties. At an online forum (South Park Studios Chat, May 10, 2001), Parker and Stone wrote that they hated both conservatives and liberals, with Stone famously commenting "I hate conservatives but I really fucking hate liberals". In 2006, Parker commented in an interview that they were aware of the concept of the South Park Republican and they both felt that they were "just pretty middle-ground guys".

Parker and Stone are often speculated to be libertarians. In an interview documented by the Rolling Stone in 2004, they both contended that the libertarian label which had been applied to them in recent years was not entirely appropriate. During an appearance on The Charlie Rose Show, Stone said that they "just play devil's advocate all the time", personifying both sides of the argument and taking "a little funny way out" to differ from the Hollywood liberals in the acting community.

At a 2006 conference in Amsterdam organized by Reason, Parker and Stone stated that if one had to put a label on them, it would be libertarian.

See also

References

Further reading 
 Yachi Hiehle, Is South Park Republican? Social and Political Attitudes in South Park, University of Arizona, 2010.
 Nick Gillespie and Jesse Walker. "South Park Libertarians: Trey Parker and Matt Stone on liberals, conservatives, censorship, and religion." Reason.com (2006): 58.
 Gournelos, Ted. Popular culture and the future of politics: Cultural studies and the Tao of South Park. Lexington Books, 2009.
 Podlas, Kimberlianne, Respect My Authority! South Park's Expression of Legal Ideology and Contribution to Legal Culture, 11 Vand. J. Ent. & Tech. L. 491 (2009).
 Weinstock, Jeffrey Andrew, ed. Taking South Park Seriously. Suny Press, 2008.

American political neologisms
Libertarianism in the United States
Political views by person
Republican Party (United States) terminology
South Park